West Coast is a former New Zealand Parliamentary electorate, from 1972 to 1996.

Population centres
There were 84 electorates for the 1969 election, and the 1972 electoral redistribution saw three additional general seats created for the North Island, bringing the total number of electorates to 87. Together with increased urbanisation in Christchurch and Nelson, the changes proved very disruptive to existing electorates. In the South Island, three electorates were abolished, and three electorates were newly created (including West Coast). In the North Island, five electorates were abolished, two electorates were recreated, and six electorates were newly created. The West Coast and Tasman electorates replaced the former Buller and Westland electorates in 1972.

Population centres of the original West Coast electorate were Haast, Whataroa, Hari Hari, Ross, Hokitika, Kumara, Greymouth, Moana, Punakaiki, Reefton, Inangahua, Westport, and Karamea. In the 1977 electoral redistribution, Springs Junction was gained from the Tasman electorate. There were no boundary changes through the 1983 and 1987 electoral redistribution.

History
Labour's Paddy Blanchfield had represented the  electorate since  and when Westland was abolished in 1972, Blanchfield transferred to the West Coast electorate. Due to the electorate being home to Blackball, the birthplace of the Labour Party, there was surprise at National's victory in 1990. Labour leader Mike Moore referred to the electorate as "Jerusalem" and was determined to recapture it.

In 1996, the first mixed-member proportional (MMP) election the electorate was combined with Tasman to form the West Coast-Tasman electorate.

Members of Parliament
Key

Election results

1993 election

1990 election

1987 election

1984 election

1981 election

1978 election

1975 election

1972 election

Notes

References

Historical electorates of New Zealand
Politics of the West Coast, New Zealand
1972 establishments in New Zealand
1996 disestablishments in New Zealand